Jeffrey Seth Rosenthal  (born October 13, 1967) is a Canadian statistician and nonfiction author. He is a professor in the University of Toronto's department of statistics, cross-appointed with its department of mathematics.

Education and career 
Rosenthal graduated from Woburn Collegiate Institute in 1984, received his B.Sc. (in mathematics, physics, and computer science) from the University of Toronto in 1988, and received his Ph.D. in mathematics ("Rates of Convergence for Gibbs Sampler and Other Markov Chains") from Harvard University in 1992, supervised by Persi Diaconis. He was an assistant professor in the Department of Mathematics at the University of Minnesota from 1992 to 1993. Rosenthal began his career in the Department of Statistics at the University of Toronto as an assistant professor in 1993, became an associate professor in 1997, and took on his current position as full professor in 2000. Rosenthal has written numerous research papers about the theory of Markov chain Monte Carlo and other statistical computation algorithms, many joint with Gareth O. Roberts.

Public engagements 
In 2005 Rosenthal wrote a book for the general public, Struck by Lightning: The Curious World of Probabilities, which was a bestseller in Canada and has been published in ten languages. He has also written a graduate textbook on probability theory and co-authored an undergraduate textbook on probability and statistics. He has been interviewed by the media about such diverse topics as crime statistics, pedestrian deaths, gambling probabilities, and television game shows, and has appeared on William Shatner's Weird or What?.

In 2006, Rosenthal did the statistical analysis used by the Canadian Broadcasting Corporation television news magazine The Fifth Estate to expose the Ontario lottery retailer fraud scandal, which was debated in the Ontario provincial legislature. In 2010 his research with Albert H. Yoon about the U.S. Supreme Court was quoted in The New York Times. He has also written about the Monty Hall problem.

Honors and awards 
Rosenthal received the CRM-SSC Prize in 2006, the COPSS Presidents' Award in 2007, the Statistical Society of Canada Gold Medal in 2013, and a Faculty of Arts & Science Outstanding Teaching Award in 1998. He was elected a Fellow of the Institute of Mathematical Statistics in 2005, and of the Royal Society of Canada in 2012.

Personal life 
Rosenthal's father Peter Rosenthal and mother Helen Stephanie Rosenthal (1942 – 2017) are both math professors at the University of Toronto. Besides his research, Rosenthal performs music and improvisational comedy, including at The Bad Dog Theatre Company.

Bibliography

References

1967 births
Canadian statisticians
Fellows of the Institute of Mathematical Statistics
Fellows of the Royal Society of Canada
Harvard University alumni
Living people
People from Scarborough, Toronto
Academic staff of the University of Toronto
University of Toronto alumni
University of Minnesota faculty
21st-century Canadian mathematicians
Probability theorists
Computational statisticians